Pulkovo  is an international airport serving St. Petersburg, Russia. The airport serves as a hub for Rossiya Airlines and as focus city for Smartavia. It is responsible for serving the citizens of Saint Petersburg, as well as the Leningrad Oblast: a total of 6,120,000 people. It is the thirty-first-busiest airport in Europe for 2022.

Description
Pulkovo Airport was officially opened on June 24, 1932, as a state-owned domestic airport. According to provisional figures for 2017, 16,125,520 passengers passed through the airport, a 21.6% increase over 2016. This makes Pulkovo the 4th busiest airport in Russia and the post-Soviet states. Pulkovo is one of the largest airports in Russia and Eastern Europe.

History

1931–1986 
In January 1931, construction of an aerodrome near Leningrad (Saint Petersburg's official name between 1924 and 1991 and the source of the airfield's IATA code of "LED" ) commenced and was completed on 24 June 1932, with the first aircraft arriving at 17:31 that day, after a two-and-a-half hour flight from Moscow carrying passengers and mail. This aerodrome was at first named Shosseynaya Airport, the name coming from the nearby Shosseynaya railway station. Soon after, the airport opened regular flights to Petrozavodsk, Pudozh, Arkhangelsk, and Murmansk.

In 1936, a foundation for a new terminal was laid out. Leningrad's airport was also provided with new G-2s and PS-84s. In 1941, a new completely commercial passenger route between Moscow and Leningrad was opened; before it was a mixed passenger-mail route. Construction of the new terminal thrived between 1937 and 1941. The architects of the new three-story terminal were Aleksandr Ivanovich Gegello and N.E. Lansere.
Construction was abruptly put on hold in July 1941, one month after Nazi Germany's invasion of the USSR on 22 June 1941. The airport was the front line in the German Siege of Leningrad. There were no flights between 1941 and 1944. The nearby Pulkovo hills were occupied by the Germans and were used by German long-range artillery for daily bombardments of Leningrad. The airport was cleared of the Germans in January 1944, and resumed cargo and mail flights after the runways were repaired in 1945. In February 1948, after the damage was completely repaired, the airport resumed scheduled passenger flights. In 1949, there were scheduled flights to 15 major cities of the USSR, and 15 more short-range flights within north-western Russia. In 1949, Shosseynaya Airport recorded a passenger traffic rate of 6,305, 333 tons of mail, and 708 tons of cargo.

In 1951, the construction of the new terminal was complete. In the mid-1950s the new extended runway was completed, allowing the airport to handle larger aircraft such as Ilyushin-18 and Tupolev-104. In that same time period, the use of jet engine planes began in Shosseynaya Airport. On 15 March 1959, the USSR-42419 Tu-104 was the first commercial jet airplane to take off from the Shosseynaya Airport.

In the early 1960s, modern regional airplanes such as the An-24 and Yak-40 began to appear in the airport. Flights to Vladivostok began to emerge in the flight lists. ICAO category 1 standards were implemented in 1965, making way for international operations. By the late 1960s, over 60 airlines had flights to and from Saint Petersburg's airport. On 8 February 1971, Shosseynaya was awarded the Order of the October Revolution. The airport was renamed Pulkovo Airport on 24 April 1973. In May 1973, the new Pulkovo 1 terminal was opened. The famous 5-cup Pulkovo 1 was designed by Alexandr Zyk. The 5 cups on top were put intentionally to give the terminal a more spacious feeling, as well as to allow more natural sunlight to pass through. This terminal is regarded as a masterpiece of Soviet postmodern architecture. Pulkovo 1 was a domestic-only terminal. Domestic air traffic increased approximately 45% every decade between the 1970-1990s. The old pre-war building of the airport was renamed to Pulkovo 2 and the terminal was exploited for international flights only.

On 11 April 1986, the new departure and arrival zones for the international terminal were completed, doubling the passenger traffic rate capacity of Pulkovo 1.

1986–2007 

In 1990, Pulkovo Airport reached its passenger traffic rate peak of over 10,000,000 passengers. After the dissolution of the Soviet Union, the number of passengers declined. In 2005, Pulkovo Airport gained independence as it separated from the Pulkovo Aviation Enterprise. Also in 2005, Rosavia declares that Pulkovo Airport (still state-owned) is to have an open tender on an investment project of the new terminal construction. This allowed it to sell shares and begin working on investment bidding projects. In 2006, Pulkovo Airport served just over 5,000,000 passengers: only 50% of the number from 1990.

2007–present 

In 2007, Grimshaw Architects was announced as the winner of the construction contract. In 2009, the Saint Petersburg Transportation Ministry requested that an operating company for Pulkovo Airport be created, and a consortium known as NCG (Northern Capital Gateway) was set up by Russian VTB Capital Bank, international Fraport AG Company, and the Greek Copelouzos Group. On 29 April 2010, NCG won the tender for a 30-year operating lease over Pulkovo Airport. On 24 November 2010, Russian Prime Minister Vladimir Putin attended a ceremony celebrating the beginning of construction on the new 150,000 m2 Terminal 1. 

From 2020, the number of destinations are expected to increase rapidly, with up to 75% increase in passenger numbers forecast. This follows a five-year test agreement permitting non-Russian airlines to operate flights from multiple European destinations into the airport under an OpenSkies/Seventh-freedom traffic right The test follows an easing of visa requirements for many European nationals wishing to visit the St Petersburg region designed to increase tourism to the city through the airport.

Terminals

Pulkovo 1 
It was built for 6,500,000 passengers annually, but by 2008 it surpassed its maximum capacity. Since its reconstruction was completed in 2014, this terminal is now used for all passenger flights, domestic and international. It has several duty-free shops, restaurants, and 6 jet bridges. It was reported that when the reconstruction of Pulkovo 1 is completed, Pulkovo Airport's capacity would increase to 17,000,000 passengers annually.

Terminal 1 
Construction of Terminal 1 was delayed several times but finally began in 2010. In November 2013, the airport was tested for errors by over 5,200 residents of Saint Petersburg who partook in the process. Several days after the test, the new Terminal 1 opened on December 3, 2013. On February 14, 2014, all operations were consolidated into the new terminal as the old Pulkovo 1 and Pulkovo 2 terminals have been shut down. The new terminal contains several business lounges, restaurants, pharmacies. Terminal 1 is 147,000 m2 and has 400,000 m2 airport dock in front of it. The airport has 88 check-in counters, 110 passport booths, 7 baggage carousels, 110 parking stands, 17 gates, and 17 escalators. The interior of the new airport was designed by Grimshaw Architects and directly correlates with the designs and style of Saint Petersburg city. The new Terminal also sought many artistic sculptures and paintings to give http://line-stargadget.ru/ a sense of thriving culture to passengers. Four sculptures from Dmitry Shorin's project named I Believe in Angels decorate the departure hall.

The current Pulkovo-1 terminal includes the new terminal and the old Soviet terminal that was re-constructed and fully converted into the departure area.

Airlines and destinations
Due to the impact of aviation in the 2022 Russian invasion of Ukraine, destinations to the European Union, United Kingdom, Australasia, North America, Switzerland, Singapore, Northeast Asia, Taiwan, Iceland, Hong Kong and Norway are suspended and banned until further notice.

Statistics

Annual traffic

Route statistics

Investors 
Northern Capital Gateway (NCG) began managing the airport in 2009.

The airport's website lists the companies currently participating alongside NCG:

"Russian VTB Capital, member of state-owned VTB Group, German Fraport AG, which manages and operates the airport of Frankfurt and many other international airports, and Horizon Air Investments S.A. member of the Greek Copelouzos Group".

Although not yet listed on the website, the latest investor is Qatar Investment Authority (QIA), which now owns a 24.99% share of the Pulkovo Airport. Sheikh Ahmed Al-Thani, vice chairman of QIA and member of Qatar's ruling Al-Thani family, is now listed as a member of the Board of Directors on the Pulkovo airport's website, along with Arturo Carta of QIA.

Ground transportation

 "Marshrutka" minibuses No. K-39 run on several lines, some of them following the city bus routes (and using matching line numbers).
 Pulkovo Airport is served by the shuttle buses(No.39 and No.39Ex). They connect the airport with metro station "Moskovskaya" on line M2.
 Train station "Аirport" (Russian "Аэропорт") is 15 minutes walk from Pulkovo 2.

For private car travel, Pulkovo Airport is accessible via the nearby Pulkovo Highway (Pulkovskoe shosse) from Saint Petersburg city center.

Accidents and incidents

 27 April 1974, an Ilyushin Il-18V passenger aircraft of Aeroflot flying to Krasnodar crashed right after takeoff from Pulkovo after an engine fire. All 108 passengers and 10 crew members died. It eventually came to be known as the 1974 Leningrad Aeroflot Il-18 crash.

See also
 List of the busiest airports in Russia
 List of the busiest airports in Europe
 List of the busiest airports in the former USSR

References

External links

 Official site 
 
 

Airports built in the Soviet Union
Airports in Saint Petersburg
Airports in Leningrad Oblast
Airports established in 1932
Buildings and structures in Saint Petersburg
Nicholas Grimshaw buildings